Her First Romance is a 1951 American drama romance film directed by Seymour Friedman and starring Margaret O'Brien, Allen Martin, Jr., Jimmy Hunt and Ann Doran.

The film's sets were designed by the art director Ross Bellah.

Plot
High-school student Betty Foster is smitten with fellow teen Bobby Evans, but when her efforts to impress him at his birthday party and in the classroom fail miserably, Betty follows him to summer camp, dragging her brother Herbie along. While competing with pretty Lucille Stewart for Bobby's affections, Betty's emotions get the best of her, and trouble ensues.

Cast
 Margaret O'Brien as Betty Foster
 Allen Martin, Jr., as Bobby Evans
 Jimmy Hunt as Herbie Foster
 Sharyn Moffett as Leona Dean
 Ann Doran as Mrs. Foster
 Lloyd Corrigan as Mr. Gauss, School Principal
 Elinor Donahue as Lucille Stewart
 Susan Stevens as Clara
 Marissa O'Brien as Tillie
 Arthur Space as Joseph "Joe" Foster
 Otto Hulett as Valentine Evans - Attorney at Law
 Lois Pace as Violet
 Harlan Warde as Paul Powers
 Maudie Prickett as Miss Pond - Schoolteacher

References

Bibliography
 Goble, Alan. The Complete Index to Literary Sources in Film. Walter de Gruyter, 1999.

External links
 

1951 films
1951 romantic drama films
American romantic drama films
Films directed by Seymour Friedman
Columbia Pictures films
1951 comedy films
American black-and-white films
1950s English-language films
1950s American films